Marshall Scott Burk (born August 2, 1956) is a former American football defensive back who played for the Cincinnati Bengals of the National Football League (NFL). He played college football at Oklahoma State University.

References 

1956 births
Living people
Players of American football from Houston
American football defensive backs
Oklahoma State Cowboys football players
Cincinnati Bengals players